Boris is an Italian television series produced from 2007 to 2010;  after eleven years of absence, a revival will be produced for Disney+ in 2021.

Boris brings to the stage the behind the scenes of a television set where a troupe is shooting Gli occhi del cuore 2 (The eyes of the heart 2), a satirical portrait of the many fictions airing on the Italian TV networks. The series consists of 3 seasons and a movie for the cinema, Boris: The Film, released in 2011.
The series was aired in premiere vision in Italy by the satellite channels FOX and FX, and subsequently on Cielo and Rai 3. The series is now on Star.

Plot 
The show starts with Alessandro arriving on the set where the TV show Gli occhi del cuore 2 (The eyes of the heart 2) is being shot as the new intern of direction. As soon as he arrives, he finds out that the world of the television is not like what he had imagined. In command of the crew there's René Ferretti, a director who gave up on quality content and shoots fictions of poor level. In addition to the members of the crew there are the actors, Stanis and Corinna, who are the protagonists of the fiction. Through Alessandro we see the making of the fiction, with its various problems and unexpected events and always at risk of being shut down.

Revival 
After various speculations, on February 16, 2021, during the press conference dedicated to the launch of the Star section of Disney+, a fourth season of  Boris  is announced, consisting of 6 episodes lasting 30 minutes each, published as  Star Original . During the presentation, the return of the historical cast was confirmed, which this time will be grappling with the world of  streaming  and  social  platforms.  The new season will be produced by Lorenzo Mieli for The Apartment, a subsidiary of Fremantle.

Cast

Main
Alessandro Tiberi (seasons 1-4) as Alessandro, the direction's intern.
Francesco Pannofino (seasons 1-4) as René Ferretti, the director.
Caterina Guzzanti (seasons 1-3) as Arianna Dell'Arti, the first assistant director.
Pietro Sermonti (seasons 1-3) as Stanis La Rochelle, the male lead in Gli occhi del cuore.
Carolina Crescentini (seasons 1-2, 4, season 3 as guest) as Corinna Negri, the female lead in Gli occhi del cuore.
Roberta Fiorentini (seasons 1-4) as Itala, the script supervisor.
Ninni Bruschetta (seasons 1-4) as Duccio Patanè, the director of photography.
Paolo Calabresi (seasons 1-4) as Augusto Biascica, the chief electrician.
Antonio Catania (seasons 1-4) as Diego Lopez, the network executive.
Alberto Di Stasio (seasons 1-4) as Sergio Vannucci, the production manager.
Carlo De Ruggieri (seasons 1-4) as Lorenzo, the enslaved intern.
Ilaria Stivali (seasons 1-2, season 3 as guest) as Gloria Spalloni, the makeup artist.
Luca Amorosino (seasons 1-4) as Alfredo, the assistant director.
Valerio Aprea, Massimo De Lorenzo and Andrea Sartoretti (seasons 1-4) as the screenwriters.
Eugenia Costantini (season 2, 3-4 as guest) as Cristina Avola Burkstaller, an actress in the TV drama Gli occhi del cuore.
Karin Proia (seasons 2-3) as Karin, an actress in the TV drama Gli occhi del cuore.
Angelica Leo (season 3, 4 as guest) as Fabiana Hassler, René's daughter and actress in Medical Dimension.
Anna Calabresi (season 4) as Lalla, the new intern.
Andrea Lintozzi (season 4) as Fabio, the new slave.

Recurring
Arnaldo Ninchi as Dottor Cane, the President of the Network (seasons 1-3)
Roberto Herlitzka as Orlando Serpentieri, an actor in Gli occhi del cuore (season 1)
Massimiliano Bruno as Nando Martellone, a comedian and actor in Gli occhi del cuore (seasons 1-2)
Sergio Fiorentini as Mario La Rochelle, Stanis' father and aspiring actor in Gli Occhi del cuore (season 1)
Luisa Ranieri as Verena, an actress in Gli occhi del cuore (season 1)
Margot Sikabonyi as Elena, Alessandro's girlfriend (seasons 1-2)
Giorgio Tirabassi as Glauco Benetti, director and René's friend (seasons 1-3)
Corrado Guzzanti as Mariano Giusti, actor in Gli occhi del cuore (season 2)
Corrado Guzzanti as Father Gabrielli, shady priest and Mariano's agent (season 2)
Emanuela Grimalda as Biascica's psychoanalyst (season 2)
Valentina Lodovini as Jasmine, an actress in Medical Dimension (season 3)
Filippo Timi as Bruno Staffa, the medical consultant for Medical Dimension (season 3)
Marco Giallini as Valerio, an actor in Medical Dimension (season 3)
Alessio Praticò as Angelo, an extra in Life of Jesus (season 4)

Guests
Trio Medusa as the hosts of La casa senza bagno (season 2)
Alessandro Mannarino as the actor playing a nurse in Medical Dimension (season 3)
Jane Alexander as a spectator at the Rome Fiction Fest (season 3)
Laura Morante as a housewife (season 3)
Sergio Brio as himself in Medical Dimension (season 3)
Paolo Sorrentino as himself (season 3)
Walter Veltroni as himself (season 4)
Fabrizio Gifuni as Pierfrancesco Favino disguised as Fabrizio Gifuni (season 4)

See also
Boris: The Film
List of Italian television series

References

External links
 Official Site 
 

Italian comedy television series
Star (Disney+) original programming
2007 Italian television series debuts
2010 Italian television series endings